Louis Barbier (1593–1670), known as Abbé de la Rivière, was a French bishop, born in Vandélicourt, near Compiègne, France. He entered the church and made his way  until he was appointed tutor and then became the friend and adviser of Gaston d'Orléans, brother of Louis XIII. He thus gained an entrance to the court, became grand almoner of the queen, and received the revenue of rich abbeys, such at Saint-Père-en-Vallée.

In March 1655 he was named bishop of Langres, but he spent his time at court, where he was always in demand, and where he gained great sums by gambling. He died very rich.

He willed 100 écus to the person who would write his epitaph, and got the following on his tomb:

References
 

1593 births
1670 deaths
Bishops of Langres
17th-century peers of France